Egor Pavlovich Popov (February 6, 1913 – April 19, 2001) was a structural and seismic engineer who helped transform the design of buildings, structures, and civil engineering around earthquake-prone regions.

A relative of inventor Alexander Stepanovich Popov, Egor Popov was born in Kiev, Russian Empire and after moving to the United States of America in 1927, he eventually earned a B.S. from UC Berkeley, his master's degree from MIT and his doctorate degree from Stanford in 1946.

During his career, Popov was primarily famous for his work doing research for the University of California, Berkeley. Some of his accomplishments include: working with buckling problems for NASA in Houston, Texas, involvement with the San Francisco–Oakland Bay Bridge, assisting with pipe testing for the Trans-Alaskan Pipeline, developing the Steel Moment Resisting Frame (resistance to earthquake forces), and eccentrically braced frames (ebf's).

Textbooks
Introduction to Mechanics of Solids, Prentice Hall, 1968. 
Mechanics of Materials, 2nd ed., Prentice Hall, 1976. 
Engineering Mechanics of Solids, 2nd ed., Prentice Hall, 1998.

References

Further reading
An interview conducted by Stanley Scott

1913 births
2001 deaths
American civil engineers
Earthquake engineering
Soviet emigrants to the United States
University of California, Berkeley faculty
American people of Russian descent
University of California, Berkeley alumni
Massachusetts Institute of Technology alumni
Stanford University alumni
20th-century American engineers